Matt Bloom is an Emmy winning and BAFTA-nominated  British director of television, commercials and short films, and a graduate of the International Film School Wales.

He directed consecutive new hit shows as lead director: The BAFTA-winning 4 O'Clock Club, All at Sea, Hank Zipzer starring Henry Winkler, The Lodge for Disney Channel, and Find Me in Paris for ZDF.

He was mentored by Moulin Rouge! and Romeo + Juliet director Baz Luhrmann, with whom he made a short film in Manchester starring Brenda Blethyn and Emma Bunton, which was shown before the Royal Premiere of Moulin Rouge!.

His award-winning short film Small Things  starred Stirling Gallacher (The Office, Little Britain) and Joe Absolom (EastEnders, Vincent).  He has recently directed commercials and virals for The Co-operative Group and BBC Comedy, and his latest short horror film, Endless   starring Chris Geere and Jenna Harrison, which won the Best Horror/Sci-Fi award at the London Independent Film Festival.

His latest music video is the Arctic-themed video "Cold Feet" for Liam Finn.

Director
Find Me in Paris – ZDF (2018–2020)
Hank Zipzer's Christmas Catastrophe – BBC, Christmas Movie (2016)
The Lodge – Disney Channel (lead director, 5 episodes 2016)
Hank Zipzer – BBC, Series 3 (lead director, 7 episodes, 2016)
Hank Zipzer – BBC, Series 2 (lead director, 6 episodes, 2015)
Hank Zipzer – BBC, Series 1 (lead director, 6 episodes, 2014)
All at Sea – BBC, Series 1 (lead director, 4 episodes, 2013–2014)
4 O'Clock Club – BBC, Series 2 (lead director, 8 episodes, 2012–2013)
4 O'Clock Club – BBC, Series 1 (lead director, 4 episodes, 2012)
Liam Finn "Cold Feet" (music video)
Endless (short horror film)
Jinx – BBC (6 episodes)
The Bill – ITV (6 episodes)
Small Things (short film)
Comedy Lab – Channel 4/E4 (1 episode)
Doctors – BBC (14 episodes)

References

External links

Matt Bloom Website

British television directors
British film directors
Living people
Year of birth missing (living people)